Kani Quzan (also Romanized as Kānī Qūzān; also known as Kānī Gūzān) is a village in Rowzeh Chay Rural District, in the Central District of Urmia County, West Azerbaijan Province, Iran. At the 2006 census, its population was 304, in 57 families.

References 

Populated places in Urmia County